Luís Azevedo da Silva Novo (born May 29, 1970 in Oliveira do Bairro) is a male long-distance runner from Portugal, who won the 2001 edition of the Vienna Marathon, clocking 2:10.28. He ended up in fourth place in the men's marathon at the 1999 World Championships.

He set het personal best time (2:09.41) in 2002 at the Berlin Marathon, when he finished in seventh place. Novo represented his native country at the 2000 Summer Olympics in Sydney, Australia, finishing in 50th place.

Achievements

References

Profile
marathoninfo

1970 births
Living people
Portuguese male long-distance runners
Portuguese male marathon runners
Athletes (track and field) at the 2000 Summer Olympics
Olympic athletes of Portugal
People from Oliveira do Bairro
Sportspeople from Aveiro District